The Gila Bend Mountains are a  long mountain range of the north-central Sonoran Desert southwest of Phoenix, Arizona and in southwest Maricopa County.

The Gila River of New Mexico and Arizona transects the entire state of Arizona, and the watershed covers about 65% of Arizona. The famous Gila Bend of the river changes the west-southwest flow to south-flowing, then back to west-flowing. Painted Rock Reservoir and the Dendora Valley are nestled at the south of the Gila Bend Mountains, the monolith which causes the diversion of the Gila Bend. Gila Bend, Arizona is located at the southeast of the bend, on Interstate 8.

Centennial Wash borders the north of the range and has its junction with the Gila River in the Arlington State Wildlife Area.

Peaks, and landforms

Two peaks are slightly west. Bunyan and Woolsey Peak slightly east are part of the larger Woolsey Peak Wilderness. The closest access town to Woolsey Peak is Arlington, Arizona.

See also
 List of mountain ranges of Maricopa County, Arizona

References

External links
 
 Bunyan Peak, trails.com (coordinates)
 Woolsey Peak, mountainzone.com (coordinates, (elevation)); list of trails

Gila River
Mountain ranges of the Sonoran Desert
Mountain ranges of Maricopa County, Arizona
Mountain ranges of Arizona